was an electoral district for the Japanese House of Representatives. The district was established In 1994 as a single member district from most of Miyagi 2nd district (excluding the city of Ishinomaki and the districts of Monou and Oshika).

As of 2022, the seat is represented by the Liberal Democratic Party member Itsunori Onodera until the next general election.

Areas Covered 
The district was abolished during the 2022 revisions to the seat apportionment for each prefecture. All of the territory that was under the 6th district was merged into the 5th district.

Areas from 2017 to 2022 
After the 2017 re-zoning, the areas covered by the district were as follows:

 Kesennuma
 Tome
 Kurihara
 Ōsaki 
 The former city of Furukawa and
 the former towns of Iwadeyama and Naruko

As a result of the rezoning, the town of Minamisanriku and the district of Motoyoshi were transferred from the 6th district to the 5th district.

Areas from 2013 to 2017 
After the 2013 re-zoning, the areas covered by the district were as follows:

 Kesennuma
 Tome
 Kurihara
 Ōsaki 
 The former city of Furukawa 
 The former towns of Iwadeyama and Naruko
 Motoyoshi District

After this zoning, the 6th ward gain the area covered by the former city of Furukawa and the former towns of Iwadeyama and Naruko from the 4th district

Areas from pre-2013 
Foem 1994 until the first rezoning in 2013, the areas covered by the district were as follows:

 Kesennuma
 Tamatsukuri District
 Kurihara District
 Tome District
 Motoyoshi District

Elected Representatives

Election Results 
‡ - Also ran in the Tohoku PR district

‡‡ - Ran and won in the Tohoku PR district

References

Related 

Districts in Miyagi Prefecture
Districts of the House of Representatives (Japan)
Politics of Miyagi Prefecture